Çobanlar can refer to:

 Çobanlar 
 Çobanlar, Afyonkarahisar 
 Çobanlar, Gazipaşa 
 Çobanlar, İvrindi
 Çobanlar, Kargı